The Los Angeles County Board of Supervisors is the legislative body of Los Angeles County, California.

Board members

Through 1851
The State of California was founded in 1850.  On February 18, 1850, the County of Los Angeles was established as one of the 27 original counties, several months before California was admitted to the Union. The Los Angeles County Board of Supervisors was created in 1852.  The Court of Sessions was used under Mexican custom until 1852.  The court was composed of a County Judge and two County Associate Justices. Julian A. Chavez served in the Court of Sessions as a "Judge of Waters" and later as a "Judge of the Plains" prior to the formation of the Board of Supervisors.

1852–1861
The Los Angeles County Board of Supervisors was created in 1852.  Terms of office through the first decade were for one year.  A piece of the county's territory was given towards the creation of San Bernardino County in 1853. [Note: Names in black have an article under that name, but not the person concerned in this table].

1862–1871
Terms of office changed to two years. A piece of the county's territory was given towards the creation of Kern County in 1866.

1872–1882
Los Angeles County is divided into four districts with two persons on behalf of the First District. [Note: Names in black have an article under that name, but not the person concerned in this table].

1883–1884
Los Angeles County is divided into seven districts.

Since 1885
Los Angeles County is divided into five districts.  Districts 1 & 3 remain at a term of two years for one period, and then four years thereafter.  Districts 2, 4, & 5 now have a term of four years.  All districts became four-year terms in a phased in process by 1887.  This allows for staggered elections every two years, which is still in effect. A piece of the county's territory was given towards the creation of Orange County in 1889. Although all local government positions in California are officially nonpartisan, virtually all board members are members of a political party and, if known, that information is included with the article.

See also

Los Angeles County, California
Board of supervisors

External links
 , the official website of the Los Angeles County Board of Supervisors
 Past members of the Board of Supervisors

County Board of Supervisors
Los Angeles County Board of Supervisors
 
Los Angeles County Board of Supervisors